Wesley Koolhof and Matwé Middelkoop were the defending champions but chose not to defend their title.

James Cerretani and Philipp Oswald won the title after defeating Miguel Ángel Reyes-Varela and Max Schnur 6–3, 6–2 in the final.

Seeds

Draw

References
 Main Draw

Marburg Open - Doubles
2016 Doubles